Román Andrés Burruchaga (born 23 January 2002) is an Argentine tennis player.

Burruchaga has a career high ATP singles ranking of 262 achieved on 21 November 2022. He also has a career high doubles ranking of 191 achieved on 3 October 2022.

Burruchaga has won 1 ATP Challenger doubles title at the 2022 Copa Sevilla with Facundo Díaz Acosta.

Challenger and World Tour finals

Singles: 4 (3–1)

Doubles: 7 (4–3)

Personal life
Burruchaga is the son of Argentine former footballer and FIFA World Cup winner Jorge Burruchaga.

References

External links
 
 

2002 births
Living people
Argentine male tennis players
Tennis players from Buenos Aires
21st-century Argentine people